Bogusławice may refer to the following places in Poland:
Bogusławice, Koło County in Greater Poland Voivodeship (west-central Poland)
Bogusławice, Kalisz County in Greater Poland Voivodeship (west-central Poland)
Bogusławice, Pleszew County in Greater Poland Voivodeship (west-central Poland)
Bogusławice, Kuyavian-Pomeranian Voivodeship (north-central Poland)
Bogusławice, Łódź Voivodeship (central Poland)
Bogusławice, Oleśnica County in Lower Silesian Voivodeship (south-west Poland)
Bogusławice, Wrocław County in Lower Silesian Voivodeship (south-west Poland)
Bogusławice, Płońsk County in Masovian Voivodeship (east-central Poland)
Bogusławice, Radom County in Masovian Voivodeship (east-central Poland)
Bogusławice, Silesian Voivodeship (south Poland)
Bogusławice, Świętokrzyskie Voivodeship (south-central Poland)